The Sisters Folk Festival is an annual three-day roots music festival held in Sisters, Oregon, United States the weekend after Labor Day.

History 
The festival was established in 1995 by Jim Cornelius and Dick Sandvik and is hosted in Sisters at ten venues throughout the city, including a 900-seat venue at the Village Green Park in downtown Sisters, and 900 seats at Sisters Art Works.

Programs 
The Americana Song Academy is a creative camp with many Sisters Folk Festival Artists arriving early to teach all aspects of music, songwriting, performance and singing.

The Americana Project is a music and arts education program with broad community outreach. It is a collaboration between Sisters Folk Festival, Creative Educational Resources, and the Sisters School District.

My Own Two Hands (MOTH) is a regional celebration of the arts. Each year a theme is selected to inspire artists to create and donate a piece of art to be sold at the benefit auction in support of youth programming.

The Song Academy for Youth brings high school students together in a non-competitive format to cultivate musicianship, songwriting and creativity.

The Winter Concert Series shows are presented from January through March in the Sisters High School auditorium.

References

Music festivals in Oregon
Folk festivals in the United States
Annual events in Oregon
Sisters, Oregon